Frankfort Town Hall is a historic town hall in Frankfort, Herkimer County, New York.  It is a "T" shaped structure with a two-story, gable roofed main block, three bays wide, flanked by identical one story wings.  It is built of hollow tile faced with red brick and cast stone trim.  It features a monumental portico consisting of smooth Doric order columns supported a molded wood frieze and triangular pediment.

It was listed on the National Register of Historic Places in 1999.

References

City and town halls on the National Register of Historic Places in New York (state)
Neoclassical architecture in New York (state)
Government buildings completed in 1924
Buildings and structures in Herkimer County, New York
National Register of Historic Places in Herkimer County, New York